Faustine Robert (born 18 May 1994) is a French professional footballer who plays as a winger or midfielder for Division 1 Féminine club Montpellier and the France national team.

Career statistics

International

References

External links
 
 
 

1994 births
Living people
People from Sète
Sportspeople from Hérault
French women's footballers
Women's association football midfielders
Division 1 Féminine players
Montpellier HSC (women) players
En Avant Guingamp (women) players
France women's youth international footballers
France women's international footballers
Footballers from Occitania (administrative region)